The 2015 Alabama Hammers season was the fifth and final season for the indoor football franchise, and their fourth in the Professional Indoor Football League (PIFL).

Schedule
Key:

Regular season
All start times are local to home team

Standings

Roster

References

Alabama Hammers
Alabama Hammers
Alabama Hammers